Jack McElhone (born 1994) is a former Scottish actor. He is famous for his role as Frankie in the 2004 film Dear Frankie, for which he was nominated for a BAFTA Scotland Award. He also had roles in Young Adam, The Book Group, Stacked and Nowhere Boy.

Filmography

References

External links

1993 births
Scottish male child actors
Scottish male film actors
Scottish male television actors
Living people
Place of birth missing (living people)